The Northern Territory Certificate of Education and Training (NTCET) is the credential awarded to High School students who successfully complete senior high school level studies (years 11 and 12 or equivalent) in the Northern Territory, Australia.

The NTCET Structure
NTCET is normally taught in years 11 and 12 of senior high school in the Northern Territory. There are two levels: Stage 1, generally taught in Year 11, and Stage 2, taught in Year 12. At least 22 approved units must be studied.

Each NTCE subject is organised into units, there is a list of subjects available to senior secondary students through Territory schools. Students can select up to 9 free choice units from Stage 1 and/or Stage 2 subject offerings. Each territory school can provide a list of senior subjects it offers.

Secondary students work towards the Northern Territory Certificate of Education. The Northern Territory Board of Studies issues the certificate to students who meet the requirements of achievement during their studies.

Calculation of the Tertiary Entrance Rank
The ATAR is calculated by the South Australian Tertiary Admissions Centre (SATAC) for students who successfully complete the Northern Territory Certificate of Education and Training (NTCET) and fulfill certain other criteria to qualify for a ATAR.

Results for the NTCET are forwarded to SATAC by the Northern Territory Board of Studies.

See also
Education in Australia
Tertiary Entrance Rank

References

External links
NT Government
NT Board of Studies

School qualifications
Australian Certificate of Education
Education in the Northern Territory